Chamborand is a commune in the Creuse department in the Nouvelle-Aquitaine region in central France.

Geography

Population

Sights
 The church of St. Martial, dating from the fifteenth century.
 Remains of a castle dating from the twelfth century, including the motte and a donjon.

See also
Communes of the Creuse department

References

External links
 A website about Chamborand 

Communes of Creuse